Nicentrus lecontei is a species of flower weevil in the beetle family Curculionidae. It is found in North America.

References

Further reading

 
 

Baridinae
Articles created by Qbugbot
Beetles described in 1908